Heteroclinus adelaidae, the Adelaide's weedfish, is a species of clinid that occurs in the Indo-Pacific waters around southern Australia.  It prefers weedy habitats down to a depth of about  where it feeds on benthic animals.  This species can reach a maximum length of  TL.

References

adelaidae
Taxa named by François-Louis Laporte, comte de Castelnau
Fish described in 1872